The 1986 Barber Saab Pro Series season was the inaugural season of the series. All drivers used Saab powered BFGoodrich shod Mondiale chassis. Willy Lewis won the inaugural championship.

Race calendar and results

Final standings

References

Barber Dodge Pro Series
1986 in American motorsport